Wyken Pippin is an old cultivar of domesticated apple originating in the Netherlands, or have originated in the garden of the Wyken Manor house in England from a seedling that was sourcing back to the Netherlands or Belgium, possibly in the early 1700s. It has several other names including 'Alford Prize' and 'Pheasant's Eye'.

It is a small greenish-yellow fruit with lenticels, flattened shape and intense and delicious flavor. Flesh texture is dense. Uses are mainly for fresh eating. It has a lower content of vitamin C relative to other apple cultivars. It was one of the top cultivars to be used for home gardening in the 19th century. It is an ancestor of Laxton's Superb.

References

External links
Flickr
Coventry Society
Salt Springs Apple Company

Apple cultivars